Tugs (stylised as TUGS) is a British television series produced by Tugs Ltd., for Television South (TVS) and Clearwater Features Ltd. and first broadcast on ITV from 4 April to 27 June 1989. It was created by Robert D. Cardona and David Mitton, who had previously produced the first two series of Thomas the Tank Engine & Friends. Set in the Roaring Twenties, the series focuses on the adventures of two anthropomorphized tugboat fleets, the Star Fleet and the Z-Stacks, who compete against each other in the fictional Bigg City Port: "the biggest harbour in the world".

The theme tune and incidental music was composed by Junior Campbell and Mike O'Donnell, who also wrote the music for Thomas & Friends (from 1984 to 2003).

Despite a second series being planned in advance, when TVS Television lost its franchise to Meridian Broadcasting, the series did not continue production past 13 episodes. Following the initial airing of the series throughout 1989, television rights were sold to an unknown party, while some models and sets from the series were sold to Britt Allcroft. Modified set props and tugboat models were used in Thomas & Friends from 1991 onwards, with footage from the original programme being heavily dubbed and edited for use in the American children's series Salty's Lighthouse.

After Clearwater's liquidation in 1990, Mitton joined The Britt Allcroft Company to continue working on Thomas & Friends in 1991, while Cardona went on to direct Theodore Tugboat, a similarly natured series set in Canada. All thirteen episodes of the show were released on VHS between 1988 and 1990.

Format and production
The series consists of thirteen fifteen-minute episodes (though four exist as twenty-minute episodes on the Tugs videos), each told by the show's narrator, Captain Star (voiced by Patrick Allen). Filming and production of the series took place throughout 1987 and 1988, in Shepperton Studios, Middlesex, where Thomas & Friends was also filmed at the time.

The series was animated using live-action models, which were seen as the most realistic method of portraying real tugboats. The set featured the Clearwater Periscope lens system, a type of professional video camera used to film at the models' eye level.

Each model was mounted on a wheeled chassis, which were then pulled through the water using transparent string. Remote control devices were initially tested in operating the machines, but the tugboats became too heavy and unable to move through the water. Remote controls were instead used to power other devices, such as the moving eye features of the models and some cranes.

Throughout the series, the two fleets primarily contest contracts to dock and tow larger sailing vessels and objects, including ocean liners, tramp steamers and schooners. Various other contractual obligations were also completed by the two fleets, including transportation of stone, munitions and logging fell.

Cast and characters

Star Fleet

The Star Fleet are the show's protagonists, who aim to work together to achieve contracts in the port. The models were styled upon the Crowley Maritime Corporation, founded in San Francisco in 1892. They are led by Captain Star, who narrates the series. The fleet consists of Ten Cents, Big Mac, O.J., Top Hat, Warrior, Hercules and Sunshine.

Another tugboat, Boomer, is briefly a member of the Star Fleet after being found floating at sea. Boomer believes himself to be jinxed, and he certainly seems to bring trouble with him wherever he goes. After numerous nasty accidents, Captain Star sells Boomer, who is later made into a houseboat. It is unknown whether he remains part of the fleet after this. The adventures of Boomer are central to the episode "Jinxed". Grampus (a naval submarine who appears throughout the series) is purchased from the Navy by Captain Star to work for the Star Fleet. It is also unknown whether this remains after the conclusion of the series.

Z-Stacks

The Z-Stacks are the show's antagonists, who are frequently seen trying to sabotage the good work of the Star Fleet. They take on the more risky contracts in the port, at the attraction of a higher pay. The models' design was taken from the Moran Tugs of New York City. They are led by Captain Zero. The fleet consists of Zorran, Zebedee, Zak, Zug and Zip. As with the Star Fleet, Boomer also briefly worked for the Z-Stacks after being sold by the former. Despite this, Boomer was also cast out of the Z-Stacks after his explosives barge spontaneously detonated.

Voice cast
Patrick Allen as Captain Star/Narrator
Simon Nash as Ten Cents
Sean Barrett as Big Mac, Hercules, Zebedee, Captain Zero, Izzy Gomez, Sea Rogue, Fire Tug, and Blair
Timothy Bateson as O.J., O. Krappenschmitt, Big Mickey, Lord Stinker, Little Ditcher, and Eddie
John Baddeley as Top Hat, Zip, Puffa, Shrimpers, Pirate Tug #2, and the Quarry Master
Mike O’Malley as Warrior, Bluenose, Frank, Mighty Mo, Sea Rogue's Uncle, Scuttlebutt Pete, Jack the Grappler, the Princess Alice, Navy Ship, Nantucket, Johnny Cuba, and Pirate Tug #1
Shaun Prendergast as Sunshine, Zak, and Philbert the Bell Buoy
Chris Tulloch as Zorran and Shrimpers
Nigel Anthony as Zug, Burke, and Davy Jones
Lee Cornes as Grampus, Billy Shoepack, Coast Guard, Boomer, and the Fuel Depot Manager
JoAnne Good as Lillie Lightship, Sally Seaplane, and Pearl
Sue Glover as S.S. Vienna

Director David Mitton also plays an old tramp steamer named Old Rusty in Episode 6.

Episodes

Tugs first aired on Children's ITV in the United Kingdom, and then on New Zealand's Channel 2 and Australia's ABC TV. Talks of a second series were never finalised, and eventually all plans to create a follow-up were dropped. Redubbed and heavily edited footage aired later as part of American children's series Salty's Lighthouse, which aired in 1997.

The series also aired in Japan with Japanese voice-overs.

Merchandise, music, and home video releases
A number of items of Tugs merchandise were produced surrounding the series' release in the early 1990s, including:

 Ertl models - Ten Cents and Sunshine models were produced by toy company Ertl. The full Star Fleet cast were originally to be produced, but only these two were made. None of the Z-Stacks were produced.
 Photo books
 2 hardback annuals
 1 hardback dot-to-dot
 Jigsaw sets
 A bed cover
 A Tugs-themed board game
 Collector's edition thimbles
 Card game
 Publicity pack

In line with the series being released in Japan, a range of Japanese merchandise was also released, such as models of the set and characters, videos, books and an LCD game.

Music
The music for Tugs was composed by Mike O' Donnell and Junior Campbell on various synthesizers. Pete Zorn played the saxophone in the theme.

UK VHS releases
A number of VHS versions of the series were released between 1988 and 1993 in the United Kingdom and Japan. All 13 episodes were originally twenty-minutes long, but were edited to fifteen minutes for television broadcasts, most likely due to time slot issues. Three of these videos contained three fifteen-minute episodes, while two contained two twenty-minute episodes. In addition, a number of original scenes were extended/deleted for the videos, including an alternate opening title sequence. Those released included:

 "Sunshine"/"Pirate"
 "Munitions"/"4th of July"
 "Trapped"/"Ghosts"/"High Winds"
 "High Tide"/"Warrior"/"Bigg Freeze"
 "Jinxed"/"Quarantine"/"Up River"

A four episode, 65-minute version was released in 1993:

 "Trapped"/"Ghosts"/"High Winds"/"4th of July"

Australian VHS releases
 Castle Vision (1992)

DVD
Tugs has not yet been released on DVD as a series. In 2005, however, footage from the show was included as part of an episode of Salty's Lighthouse on the DVD Toddler Time.

Preservation

TUGS: The Exhibition
In 2012, having long been presumed destroyed, the original models from the series were located and purchased by a group of fans via eBay UK. In early 2013, they established 'The Star Tugs Company Ltd' (now renamed TUGS: The Exhibition) - a dedicated non-for-profit trust aiming to preserve, restore and display the various models and props used in the production. As of 2020, the exhibition owns the majority of the leading and supporting cast (with the exception of Top Hat and Grampus whose whereabouts are unknown), several alternate faces for the characters, various props and other related assets to the series.  In March 2022, Tugs The Exhibition announced that they had been the first group to be officially licensed by rights holders following the successful reconciliation of the rights to the series.

The exhibition was held in a railway coach, situated at Butterley station at the Midland Railway - Butterley in Derbyshire, England and is open to the public at special 'TUGS' weekends.

References

Citations

General

External links

 
 Interviews with crew on Sodor Island fansite
Original models on display and interviews documentary video
Tugs on YouTube

 
Television series set in the 1920s
1989 British television series debuts
1989 British television series endings
1980s British children's television series
British children's adventure television series
British children's comedy television series
British preschool education television series
ITV children's television shows
Australian Broadcasting Corporation original programming
Television shows produced by Television South (TVS)
English-language television shows
Television series by ITV Studios
Tugboats in fiction